Šuwaliyat is a Hittite god. His Hurrian equivalent is Tašmišu.

Šuwaliyat is the brother of the most important Hittite god Tarḫunna. In the Hurro-Hittite "Song of Ullikummi" Šuwaliyat appears as the wind or a storm traveling around with the weather god Tarḫunna. He is also the vizier and older brother of Tarḫunna. The other sibling of Šuwaliyat is Aranzah, the personification of the river Tigris. In Hurro-Hittite mythology he visits the goddess Lelwani in the Underworld together with Tarḫunna.

Literature 
 Volkert Haas: Die hethitische Literatur, Walter de Gruyter GmbH & Co. KG, Berlin 2006, pages 132, 136, 150, 178 and 180, 

Hittite deities
Hittite mythology